Francis Lafayette Quinn (March 22, 1903 in Washougal, Washington – December 13, 1931 near Fresno, California) was an American racing driver. Quinn was a prominent figure in racing on America's west coast, including winning the American Automobile Association's Pacific Southwest championship in 1930.National Sprint Car Hall of Fame: Francis Quinn Quinn attempted entry into the Indianapolis 500 multiple times, but was denied due to an abnormally large heart. He was finally allowed entry in 1931 after his Pacific Southwest championship win the year prior.

Quinn died December 13, 1931 in a traffic collision five miles north of Fresno, California. While driving his passenger car back from a rained-out event scheduled at Oakland Speedway, Quinn's southbound car was struck by an oncoming car. Quinn died at the roadside, while his passenger, Claude French, escaped with only minor injuries. Manslaughter charges were filed against the driver of the other car, but he was acquitted in court.

Quinn was inducted into the National Sprint Car Hall of Fame in 2006.

Indianapolis 500 results

References

External Links

Stats on Racing Reference

1903 births
1931 deaths
Indianapolis 500 drivers
National Sprint Car Hall of Fame inductees
AAA Championship Car drivers
People from Washougal, Washington
Racing drivers from Washington (state)
Road incident deaths in California